Éditions Albert René is a French publishing house created in 1979 by cartoonist Albert Uderzo, two years after the death of his collaborater scriptwriter René Goscinny. The company Hachette Livre owns 100% of the publishing house since 2011. Éditions Albert René control the publication of the Astérix series (from the album Asterix and the Great Divide, 25th album in the series), Jehan Pistolet, Oumpah-Pah and the other joint works of Uderzo and Goscinny.

References

Asterix
Comic book publishing companies of France
French companies established in 1979
Publishing companies established in 1979
2011 mergers and acquisitions